The 2013 Phillips 66 Big 12 Men's Basketball Championship was held at the Sprint Center in Kansas City, Missouri from March 13 - March 16, 2013. This tournament marked the debut of TCU and West Virginia in the event. First round games were aired on the Big 12 Network, Quarterfinal games were aired on ESPN2 and the Big 12 Network. Semifinal games were available in the conference footprint on the Big 12 Network and outside league markets on ESPNU. All games were carried on WatchESPN, with most also available via ESPN Full Court.  The Kansas Jayhawks defeated the Kansas State Wildcats 70-54 in the Championship game, which was televised by ESPN, to receive the Big 12's automatic bid to the 2013 NCAA tournament.  All 10 teams qualified for the tournament, with ties broken by using a tiebreaker system.

Seeding
The Tournament consisted of a 10 team single-elimination tournament with the top 6 seeds receiving a bye.

Schedule

Bracket

Rankings (#) refer to AP rankings

All-Tournament Team
Most Outstanding Player – Jeff Withey, Kansas

See also
2013 Big 12 Conference women's basketball tournament
2013 NCAA Division I men's basketball tournament
2012–13 NCAA Division I men's basketball rankings

References

External links
Official 2013 Big 12 Men's Basketball Tournament Bracket
 

Tournament
Big 12 men's basketball tournament
Big 12 men's basketball tournament
Big 12 men's basketball tournament
College sports tournaments in Missouri